George Thurland Prior FRS (16 December 1862 – 8 March 1936) was a British mineralogist. He made great contributions to mineralogical chemistry, petrology and meteoritics.

He was born in Oxford, England, and attended Magdalen College there in 1881. He received a first class in the Honour School in Chemistry in 1885 and Physics in 1886. Later he went to study in Germany. He obtained his Doctor of Science degree from Oxford University in 1905.

He entered the British Museum in 1887, where he was Keeper of Minerals from 1909 to 1927. He was elected a Fellow of the Royal Society in 1912.

Selected publications

See also
 Glossary of meteoritics
 Prior Island
 Meteorite classification#History

References

1862 births
1936 deaths
British mineralogists
Alumni of Magdalen College, Oxford
Employees of the British Museum
Fellows of the Royal Society
Meteorite researchers
People from Oxford